Coleophora salsolella is a moth of the family Coleophoridae. It is found in Algeria and the Palestinian Territories.

The larvae feed on Caroxylon vermiculatum var. microphyllum. They feed on the generative organs of their host plant.

References

salsolella
Moths of Africa
Moths of the Middle East
Moths described in 1915